TTO may refer to:
Time-trade-off
Trinidad and Tobago, by ISO 3166-1 alpha-3 and IOC codes
Tactical Technology Office, a division of DARPA
Technology Transfer Office
Toontown Online, massively multiplayer online role-playing game by Disney
Transtrachreal oxygen, as used during Jet ventilation
Trailing throttle oversteer, also known as lift-off oversteer
Twist-to-open razor, a type of safety razor (see mention under Gillette (brand))
Triple tibial osteotomy